Ross Township is located in Pike County, Illinois. As of the 2010 census, its population was 70 and it contained 54 housing units. Ross originally formed as Spring Lake Township from a portion of Atlas Township in July, 1879, but changed its name to Ross shortly after the formation with the exact date unknown.

Geography

Demographics

References

External links
City-data.com
Illinois State Archives

Townships in Pike County, Illinois
Townships in Illinois